Numbri Aadmi (Man with Number) is a 1991 Indian Hindi-language action film directed by Swaroop Kumar, produced by Dimppy Ramdayal, starring Mithun Chakraborty, Kimi Katkar, Sangeeta Bijlani and Amrish Puri.

Plot
The plot revolves with an unknown Robinhood character who helps the poor and honest when they are threatened and harassed by powerful, ruthless and corrupt people. People call him as Numbri Aadmi, but they are unable to trace him, even though he lives among them.

Cast
Mithun Chakraborty as Shankar / Dildaar Khan
Sangeeta Bijlani as Sangeeta
Kimi Katkar as Bijli
Sonu Walia as Paro
Kunal Goswami as Raj Pratap Singh
Suresh Oberoi as A.C.P. Vijay Pratap Singh
Navin Nischol as I.G.P.
Aruna Irani as Champabai
Amrish Puri as Shamsher Singh / Rana
Ishrat Ali as Inspector Kashigar
Rakesh Bedi as Rakesh
Jagdeep as Police Inspector
Arun Bakshi as Inspector Anand Srivastav
Bob Christo as Don
Guddi Maruti as Sindhi wife
Shiva Rindani as Shiva, Henchman of Rana
Mac Mohan  as Henchman of Rana
Kamaldeep as Henchman of Rana
Amit Bhalla as Ranjeet
Mushtaq Merchant as Anand Shrivastav

Songs
"Teri Gathri Me Laaga Chor" - Amit Kumar, Sapna Mukherjee, Bappi Lahiri
"Aaj Nach Nach Ke" - Kavita Krishnamurthy, Sapna Mukherjee, Anupama Deshpande
"Chham Chham Bole Mere Ghunghroo" - Asha Bhosle
"Kano Me Kahne Wali Hai Jo" - Kavita Krishnamurthy, Amit Kumar
"Mujhe Numbri Kaho" - Amit Kumar

References

External links
 

1991 films
1990s Hindi-language films
Films scored by Bappi Lahiri
Indian action drama films